Tolga is the administrative centre of Tolga Municipality in Innlandet county, Norway. To the southeast of the village, lies the long Hodalen valley where the villages of Hodalen and Øversjødalen are located.

The large, octagonal Tolga Church is located in the village.

The Rørosbanen railway line runs through the village, stopping at Tolga Station.

References

Tolga, Norway
Villages in Innlandet